Qinfeng is a town in Lufeng County, Yunnan, China.

References

Township-level divisions of Chuxiong Yi Autonomous Prefecture